This page lists the armoury (emblazons=graphics and blazons=heraldic descriptions; or coats of arms) of the communes from A-C in Oise (department 60), which is split due to its length.

Other pages:

 Armorial of the Communes of Oise (A–C)
 Armorial of the Communes of Oise (D–H)
 Armorial of the Communes of Oise (I–P)
 Armorial of the Communes of Oise (Q–Z)

A

B

C

References 

Oise
Oise